John Hanfield Brunskill  (17 April 1875 – 21 July 1940) was an Irish cricketer. A left-handed batsman and right-arm medium pace bowler, he played one match for Ireland, against the MCC in May 1895. He also played four first-class matches for Dublin University the same year.

After qualifying in medicine from Trinity College he was commissioned into the Royal Army Medical Corps  He served with bravery in the First World War, receiving a Distinguished Service Order for gallantry. At the end of the war he was medical officer in the allied forces Dunsterforce expedition. He retired with the rank of lieutenant-colonel. He moved to England following the end of the War, when he also received the OBE, and became a general practitioner in Kingston upon Thames. He married Elizabeth Robinson and had three children Pamela, Sheila and John.

References
CricketEurope Stats Zone profile

1875 births
1940 deaths
Irish cricketers
Dublin University cricketers
Cricketers from Dublin (city)
British Army personnel of World War I
Royal Army Medical Corps officers
Companions of the Distinguished Service Order
Officers of the Order of the British Empire
Alumni of Trinity College Dublin